Tecoma × smithii, "Orange Bells", is a hybrid flowering plant in the genus Tecoma. It was first described by W. Watson in London, 1893.

References

smithii
Hybrid plants
Taxa named by William Watson (botanist)